Ibn Furak or Ibn Faurak; c. 941–c. 1015  CE / 330–406 AH) was a Muslim Imam, a theologian of Ash'arite school, a specialist of Arabic language, grammar and poetry, an orator, a jurist, and a hadith scholar from the Shafi'i Madhhab in 10th century.

Life

Birth and Education
Abu Bakr Muhammad bin al-Hasan bin Furak al-Shafi'i al-Ansari al-Isbahani was born in around 941 CE (330 AH) in Isfahan. He studied Ash'arite creed and kalam under Abu 'l-Hasan al-Bahili along with Al-Baqillani and al-Isfara'ini in Basra and Baghdad, and also traditions under 'Abd Allah bin Ja'far al-Isbahani. From 'Iraq he went to Rayy, then to Nishapur, where a madrasa was built for him beside the Khanqah of the Sufi al-Bushandji. He was in Nishapur before the death of the Sufi Abu 'Uthman al-Maghribi in 373/983, and probably remained there until shortly before his death."

Career
Ibn Furak was the master and teacher of Al-Qushayri and Al-Bayhaqi, who both often mention Ibn Furak and praising him: "He (Ibn Furak) fought and defeated the deviant Anthropromorphists, the Karramiyya, then he travelled to Nishapur where he trained and taught generations of scholars. In Nishapur, he brought the transmissions of the narrators of Basra and Baghdad, both from Iraq, and also authored a number of books in various fields and Islamic sciences.

Dispute and Death

The Karramiyya tried to initially have him executed by the Sultan Mahmud of Ghazni but failed after the Sultan summoned him to Ghazni and questioned him then exonerated him of the charges they had brought against him. However, the historical sources differ in determining the cause of his death by the Karramiyya. One version says that upon returning from Ghazni, he was poisoned, fell on the road, and died in 1015 CE (406 AH) while another version says that he was attacked from behind. He was carried back to Nishapur and buried in al-Hira.

Controversy
Al-Dhahabi mentions Ibn Furak in a short reference stating some inaccurate and defaming reports from Ibn Hazm, without questioning their intent where Ibn Furak was unjustly accused of claiming the prophethood ends after the death of prophet Muhammad and other slanders that accuse him of disbelief. Despite this, Al-Dhahabi goes on to say: "Ibn Furak was better than Ibn Hazm, of a greater stature (rank among scholars) and better belief (creed)."

Ibn al-Subki provided evidence that this statement by Ibn Hazm were "anti-Ash'ari fabrications and forgeries" falsely attributed to Ibn Furak. He showed how these reports were refuted by Al-Qushayri and Ibn al-Salah. Ibn al-Subki then quotes Ibn Furak's own words testifying his true creed. Ibn Furak says:

"The Ash'ari belief (creed) is that our prophet (PBUH) is alive in his Blessed Grave and is the Messenger of Allah (God), forever until the End of times, this is literally, not metaphorically or symbolically, and the correct Belief is that he (Prophet Muhammad PBUH) was a Prophet when Adam (AR) was between Water and Clay, and his Prophethood remains until now, and shall ever remain."

Influences
Ibn Furak's works in "Usul al-Din" (foundation of religion), "Usul al-fiqh" (foundation of jurisprudence), and the meanings of the Quran count nearly one hundred volumes. Among them are Mujarrad Maqâlât al-Ash`arî and Kitab Mushkil al-hadith wa-bayanihi (with many variants of the title), in which he refuted both the anthropomorphist tendencies of karramis and the over-interpretation of the Mu'tazila. Ibn Furak said that he embarked on the study of kalam because of the hadîth reported from the Prophet.

His main work in the eyes of later generations is Tabaqat al-mutakallimin which is the main source to study al-Ash'ari theology.

Early Islam scholars

References

Sources
 

940s births
1015 deaths
10th-century Iranian writers
Quranic exegesis scholars
Shafi'is
Asharis
Sunni imams
Sunni fiqh scholars
Sunni Muslim scholars of Islam
10th-century Muslim scholars of Islam
10th-century jurists
11th-century jurists
11th-century Iranian writers